Alfred Friendly (December 30, 1911 – November 7, 1983) was an American journalist, editor and writer for The Washington Post.  He began his career as a reporter with the Post in 1939 and became Managing Editor in 1955.  In 1967 he covered the Mideast War for the Post in a series of articles for which he won the Pulitzer Prize for International Reporting in 1968.  He is credited with bringing the Post from being a local paper to having a position of national prominence.

Background

Alfred Friendly was born on December 30, 1911, in Salt Lake City. In 1933, he graduated from Amherst College.  His parents were Edward Rosenbaum and Harriet Friendly.

Career

In 1933, Friendly came to Washington, DC, to look for work.  A former professor who worked in the Commerce Department hired him, but his appointment to a high position at such a young age earned him criticism in the press and he resigned.  For the next year he traveled the country in the middle of the Depression, eventually returning to become a reporter at The Washington Daily News, writing a column for government employees.  Less than two years later he was hired to write the same kind of column for the Post, where he was soon assigned to cover war mobilization efforts and anti-war strikes.

When World War II broke out he entered the Army Air Force, rising to the rank of major before leaving in 1945.  While in the military he was involved in cryptography and intelligence operations, finally becoming the second in command at Bletchley Park, and the highest ranking American officer there.  After the war he remained in Europe as press aide to W. Averell Harriman, supervisor of the Marshall Plan.

A year later he returned to Washington and to the Post, where he became assistant managing editor in 1952 and managing editor in 1955. In 1966 he became an associate editor and a foreign correspondent based out of London. Hearing rumors of war in 1967 he headed to the Middle East where he was present throughout the 1967 War and wrote his series of award-winning articles. He retired from the Post in 1971, though he continued writing occasional editorials and book reviews.

Personal life and death

Friendly married Jean; they had five children.

In 1983, at age 71, Friendly, who had developed both lung and throat cancer, committed suicide by shooting himself.

Awards
 1958: Honorary Doctorate, Amherst College
 1968: Pulitzer Prize

Legacy

After his death, the Alfred Friendly Foundation was established.  It administers the Alfred Friendly Press Partners to bring foreign journalists to the United States for internships at prominent news organizations. The Archives and Special Collections at Amherst College holds a collection of his papers.

Works

During his retirement, Friendly wrote several books:
Crime and Publicity (1967)
Beaufort of the Admiralty (1977)
The Dreadful Day: The Battle of Manzikert, 1071 (1982)

Articles:  
 "McCarthyism Revisited"

See also

 Alfred Friendly Foundation
 The Washington Post

References

External links
Alfred Friendly (AC 1933) Papers at the Amherst College Archives & Special Collections
Alfred Friendly Foundation, Press Fellowships

The Washington Post people
Pulitzer Prize for International Reporting winners
American male journalists
20th-century American journalists
Amherst College alumni
1911 births
1983 deaths
20th-century American male writers
20th-century American non-fiction writers
1983 suicides